Rise and Fall may refer to:

Music
 Rise and Fall (band), a Belgian hardcore band

Songs
 "Rise & Fall" (Justice Crew song), a 2014 song by Justice Crew
 "Rise & Fall" (Craig David song), a 2003 song by Craig David featuring Sting
 "Rise & Fall" (Michael Molly & Alex Evans), a 2013 song by Michael Molloy & Alex Evans
 "Rise and Fall" (song), a song from the Offspring's 2008 album Rise and Fall, Rage and Grace

Albums
 Rise and Fall (Dargaard album), 2004
 Rise and Fall (Tim Halperin album), 2011
 Rise and Fall (Warlocks album), 2001
 The Rise & Fall, a 1982 album by Madness

Games
 Rise and Fall: Civilizations at War, 2006 computer game
 Civilization VI: Rise and Fall, 2018 expansion pack for Civilization VI

Other uses
 Rises and falls, a category of ballroom dance techniques

See also
 
 The History of the Decline and Fall of the Roman Empire